Chris Kelly may refer to:

Music
 Chris Kelly (jazz) (1890–1929), American jazz trumpeter
 Chris Kelly (composer) (born 1982), Canadian music composer and film producer
 Chris "Mac Daddy", Kelly (1978–2013), member of American rap duo Kris Kross
 Chris Kelly, guitar player for Stars Underground
 Chris Kelly, guitar player for Babymetal

Politics
 Chris Kelly (American politician) (born 1946), American politician
 Chris Kelly (British politician) (born 1978), Conservative MP for Dudley South 2010–2015

Sports
 Chris Kelly (footballer, born 1887) (1887–1960), English football player
 Chris Kelly (footballer, born 1948), English football player
 Chris Kelly (ice hockey) (born 1980), Canadian hockey player
 Chris Kelly (Gaelic footballer) (born 1997)

Writers
 Chris Kelly (writer) (born 1983), American writer for SNL and director of Other People
 Chris "Casper" Kelly (writer), American writer, television director, and producer

Other
 Chris Kelly (TV presenter) (born 1940), former presenter of Food and Drink and Wish You Were Here...?
 Chris Kelly (entrepreneur) (born 1970), executive at Facebook

See also 
 Christopher Kelly (disambiguation)